Saint Thomas Aquinas College (STAC) is a Roman Catholic private school located at the corner between Bagares Street and Concepcion Street, Barangay Zone IV, Sogod, Southern Leyte, Philippines. It is considered one of the oldest schools in Southern Leyte, serving the community since January 6, 1946. One of its sister schools are the Saint Teresa School of Hilongos (STSH) and Saint Anthony's High School (SAHS) of Anahawan.

History

STAC started after World War II settled down when Fr. Luis Caintic saw the need for the town to have a learning institution named after the patron saint of Catholic education, Saint Thomas Aquinas. In 1952, the Saint Thomas Aquinas Academy or STAA Normal Department produced 26 graduates with Elementary Teachers' Certificate (ETC) as well as 17 pupils from the Elementary Department. However, enrollment suffered a major setback in December 1951 when Typhoon Amy, one of the most destructive in that decade, ravaged the town. In 1952, Fr. Sergio Osmeña took the reins of running STAA from Fr. Caintic. A year later, he was replaced by Fr. Generoso Nielo. With the aid of some devotees of the Blessed Lady, he initiated the construction of the existing Grotto of Our Lady of Lourdes. Fr. Neilo was followed by Fr. Porfirio Suarez (1962–1972).

Under the directorship of Fr. Vicente Lora (1972–1980) many changes in the structures of STAA took place: A library, the administration building and a basketball court/quadrangle were constructed. During the term of Fr. Juanito Arreglo as director (1982–1986), STAA established a Kindergarten School and a building was constructed for this purpose. When Fr. Manuel Nueve (1986–1992) took over, a two-room classroom building was constructed. Realizing the need to upgrade the school's facilities and to keep abreast with the challenging needs of the times, the school expanded its services when Msgr. Amado D. Olayvar assumed in office in 1992. STAA offered a Junior Secretarial course later reclassified into an Associate in Computer Secretarial. It was also during Msgr. Olayvar's stewardship that STAA was converted into a collegiate institution on August 7, 1997, through SEC Registration No. A19971565. From then on, Saint Thomas Aquinas College (STAC) came into existence.

With Fr. Lorenzo Suarez's presence (1999–2001) at STAC, the Associate in Computer Secretarial was converted into Associate in Office Administration. He was replaced by Fr. Remegio P. Mollaneda, SVD, PhD (2001–2003) who worked out that STAC be given slots at the Catholic Media Center as its Computer Laboratory. It serves as extension of the school's computer lab for high school and college students. He also worked out government recognition of the following four-year degree courses: Bachelor of Science in Office Administration (BSOA), Major in Computer Education; Bachelor of Science in Commerce (BSC) in Entrepreneurship; Bachelor in Elementary Education (BEEd), Major in Communication Arts in English. The stage was improved through the Parents Teachers and Community Association (PTCA).

Today
At present, Rev. Fr. Merwin L. Kangleon is striving to improve the school facilities and manage the three-storey, 12-classroom building and constructed the new STAC building whereas the J&F Department Store took in place. He has done multiple projects such as building a chapel, replacing many old computers, repairing damaged sections, and the re-beautification of the school. Most importantly, the spiritual formation and improvement of academic performance of the pupils, students and even of the faculty and staff has been improved. This is made possible through the wholehearted cooperation of the parents, alumni, community and by the pupils, students, faculty and staff.

See also
Sogod, Southern Leyte
Education in the Philippines - Tertiary Education

References

External links 
 Saint Thomas Aquinas College (Sogod) - Philippine Company Profile

Educational institutions established in 1946
Universities and colleges in Southern Leyte
1946 establishments in the Philippines